Together, As One is an album by British jazz quartet Dinosaur. It was released in 2016 on Edition Records. In 2017, it was nominated for the Mercury Prize.

Critical reception
The album has received generally positive reviews, receiving five stars from The Guardian, four from The Jazz Mann, and four and a half from All About Jazz.

Track listing

Personnel
Laura Jurd – trumpet, synth
Elliot Galvin – keyboard, synth
Conor Chaplin – electric bass
Corrie Dick – drums
Sonny Johns – Recording and Mix Engineer

References 

2016 albums
Dinosaur (jazz quartet) albums